Bruce Adler (November 27, 1944 – July 25, 2008) was an American Broadway actor. After debuting on the Broadway stage in the 1979 revival of Oklahoma!, he went on to a career that saw him nominated for Tony Awards as Best Featured Actor in a Musical for Those Were the Days (1991) and Crazy For You (1992). His film work was limited to voice work in animated films, notably providing the singing voice for the peddler of the 1992 Disney film Aladdin and the 1996 sequel Aladdin and the King of Thieves.

Early life
Born in New York City, Adler's parents, Henrietta Jacobson and Julius Adler, and his two maternal uncles, Irving and Hymie Jacobson were well-established popular stars of the Yiddish theatre, at the time in its heyday on New York's Lower East Side. Adler made his stage debut at an early age, appearing with his parents. The three Adlers played the London Palladium with Sophie Tucker in the 1950s. He continued to appear in Yiddish theatre throughout his teens, also appearing in mainstream American theatre as his parents made a similar "crossover," most notably appearing in productions of Neil Simon's Come Blow Your Horn.

Career
Adler served in the United States Army from 1966 through 1968. He continued his career thereafter, firmly straddling the two worlds of Yiddish and American Theatre. After much success in regional theatre, Adler made his Broadway debut as Ali Hakim, the Peddler, in the 35th anniversary production of Oklahoma! in 1979. He was following in the footsteps of actor Joseph Buloff, who had created the role in 1943, and also had a huge background on the Yiddish stage. Other Broadway shows included Oh, Brother! (1981), Sunday in the Park with George (1984), Broadway (1987), Rumors (1988), Those Were The Days (1991), where he won the Drama Desk Award, and Crazy for You (1992). Adler stayed with Crazy for You for the entirety of its four-year run on Broadway.

Off-Broadway, Adler appeared in several well-received Yiddish speaking and Jewish-themed productions of the last 30 years, including The Golden Land (1985), On Second Avenue (1987),The Rise of David Levinsky (1987) and many others. He appeared in many summer productions at The Muny Theater in St. Louis. He had a voice role in Disney's animated film, Beauty and the Beast, as well as roles in television shows such as Law & Order.

Adler created a second career for himself starting in the mid-1990s, with a series of shows which played to huge success in the legitimate theatres of South Florida from the Palm Beaches to Ft. Lauderdale to Miami. His shows paid tribute to the performers who had shaped his own style including Danny Kaye, Sammy Davis, Jr., Red Buttons, Cab Calloway and Jimmy Durante, among others.

In a review of Adler's one-man show Song and Dance Man, The New York Times critic Richard F. Shepard wrote, "What is there that this man can't do? He kazotskys, he soft shoes, he fandangos...He makes the oldest jokes fresh and funny!...It is impossible to watch him without being seized by his infectious spirit, his complete enjoyment in what he is doing...he brings performing brilliance to the stage!"

Personal life and death
Adler's first marriage ended in divorce in 2002. He married director/actress Amy London in 2003. In February 2007, he and London had their first child together, Jacob Hayden Adler.

Bruce Adler died of liver cancer at age 63 on July 25, 2008. His last public appearance was in May 2008 at Carnegie Hall, where he recreated several numbers that evening in a gala celebration for the New York Festival of Song.

References

External links

1944 births
2008 deaths
Male actors from New York City
American male musical theatre actors
American male stage actors
Jewish American male actors
American male television actors
American male voice actors
American people of Polish-Jewish descent
Deaths from cancer in Florida
Deaths from liver cancer
Yiddish theatre performers
Drama Desk Award winners
20th-century American singers
20th-century American male actors
20th-century American male singers
20th-century American Jews
21st-century American Jews